Xavier Charles René Rohart (born 1 July 1968 in Thionville) is a French sailor. A member of the YC La Pelle in Marseille, he is now competing in the Star class. He won a bronze medal in the Star class with Pascal Rambeau at the 2004 Summer Olympics, and has also competed at four other Olympics. He is a two-time world champion and is a founder of the Star Sailors League. He now sails with Pierre-Alexis Ponsot.

Records

Olympic Games 
 6th at the 2008 Olympics in Beijing in Star with Pascal Rambeau.
  Bronze medal at the 2004 Olympics in Athens in Star with Pascal Rambeau.
 5th at the 2000 Summer Olympics in Sydney in Finn.
 7th at the 1992 Summer Olympics in Barcelona in Finn.

World Championship 
  World Champion in Star in 2003 and 2005
  World vice-champion in Star in 2007
  Third in Star in 2002 et 2006
  Third in Finn in 1997 and 1998

European Championship 
  European champion in Star in 2015
  European vice-champion in Star in 2006
  European vice-champion in Finn in 1997

Star Sailors League Finals 
 6th at the Star Sailors League Finals 2014 in Nassau in Star. 
 6th at the Star Sailors League Finals 2013 in Nassau in Star.

Distinction 
 Elected Sailor of the year of the Fédération Française de Voile in 2003 with his crew Pascal Rambeau

References

External links
 
 
 

French male sailors (sport)
Olympic sailors of France
Sailors at the 1992 Summer Olympics – Finn
Sailors at the 2000 Summer Olympics – Finn
Sailors at the 2004 Summer Olympics – Star
Sailors at the 2008 Summer Olympics – Star
Sailors at the 2012 Summer Olympics – Star
Olympic bronze medalists for France
Olympic medalists in sailing
Star class world champions
Medalists at the 2004 Summer Olympics
1968 births
Living people
People from Thionville
World champions in sailing for France
Sportspeople from Moselle (department)